The following is a list of restaurant chains.

International

Argentina
California Burrito Co.
Mostaza

Australia

Canada

Costa Rica
 Rostipollos

Denmark
 Jensen's Bøfhus

Egypt
 Cook Door
 Mo'men

Finland
 Hesburger
 Kotipizza
 Rolls

France
 Bel Canto
 Buffalo Grill
 Flunch
 Hippopotamus
 Quick
 Brioche Dorée

Germany

 Kochlöffel
 Nordsee
 Wienerwald
 Vapiano

Greece
 Goody's

Hong Kong
 Café de Coral

India

 Adyar Ananda Bhavan
 Annapoorna Gowrishankar
 Bikanervala
 Goli Vada Pav
 Haldiram's
 Indian Coffee House
 Moshe's
 Murugan Idli Shop
 Namma Veedu Vasanta Bhavan
 Saravana Bhavan

Indonesia
 Bakmi GM
 CFC
 Es Teler 77
 Geprek Bensu
 HokBen
 J.CO Donuts & Coffee
 Kebab Turki Baba Rafi
 Klenger Burger
 Naughty Nuri's
 Restoran Sederhana

Ireland

Israel
 Burgeranch

Italy
Spizzico

Japan
Anna Miller's
Gyoza no Ohsho
Ippudo
Kura
Ringer Hut
Saizeriya
Sukiya

Korea, South
 Angel In Us Coffee
 Bonchon Chicken
 The Coffee Bean
 Kyochon Chicken
 Lotteria
 Paris Baguette
 Tom and Toms Coffee
 Tous Les Jours

Lebanon 
 Zaatar w Zeit

Malaysia
 Big Apple Donuts and Coffee
 The Chicken Rice Shop
 Kenny Rogers Roasters
 KLG
 Marrybrown
 OldTown White Coffee
 Pelita Nasi Kandar
 Rotiboy
 Sate Kajang Haji Samuri
 SCR
 Secret Recipe

Mexico
 Benedetti's Pizza
 Carlos'n Charlie's
 Peter Piper Pizza
 El Pollo Loco
 Sanborns Cafe
 Señor Frog's
 Sirloin Stockade

Netherlands 
 FEBO
 La Place
 Nam Kee

Nigeria
 Cafè Neo
 Chicken Republic
 Kilimanjaro
 Mama Cass
 Mr Bigg's
 Tantalizers

Norway
 Big Bite
 Egon
 Peppes Pizza

Philippines

Poland

Puerto Rico
 Martin's BBQ

Russia
 Teremok
 Dodo Pizza
 Vkusno i tochka (formerly McDonald's)

South Africa

 Chicken Licken
 Nando's
 Spur Steak Ranches
 Steers
 Wimpy

Spain
 Cervecería 100 Montaditos
 Rodilla
 Telepizza
 Foster's Hollywood

Sweden

 Max Hamburgers

Switzerland
 Hiltl Restaurant

Taiwan

 85C Bakery Cafe
 Chatime
 Louisa Coffee
 TKK Fried Chicken

Thailand
 Chester's
 EST.33
 Five Star Burger
 Five Star Chicken
 Gaggan
 MK Restaurant
 The Pizza Company
 Royal Dragon Restaurant
 Sirocco

Turkey
 Mado

United Arab Emirates
 Al Farooj Fresh
 Arab Udupi
 ChicKing
 Just Falafel

United Kingdom

 Aberdeen Angus Steak Houses
 All Bar One
 AMT Coffee
 Ask
 Beefeater
 Bella Italia
 Brewers Fayre
 Café Rouge
 Caffè Nero
 Chicken Cottage
 Chiquito
 Coffee Republic
 Dixy Chicken
 EasyPizza
 Eat
 Frankie & Benny's
 Giraffe Restaurants
 Gourmet Burger Kitchen
 Greggs
 Harry Ramsden's
 Harvester
 Hotcha
 Hungry Horse
 Itsu
 J D Wetherspoon
 Leon
 Little Chef
 Loch Fyne
 Millie's Cookies
 OK Diner
 Pret a Manger
 Prezzo
 Pizza Express
 Punch Taverns
 Scream Pubs
 Slug and Lettuce
 Spudulike
 Strada
 Table Table
 Taybarns
 Toby Carvery
 Upper Crust
 Veeno
 Wagamama
 Wasabi
 Walkabout
 West Cornwall Pasty Company
 Wimpy
 Yates's
 YO! Sushi
 Zizzi

United States

See also

 List of barbecue restaurants
 List of coffeehouse chains
 List of chicken restaurants
 List of fast food restaurant chains
 List of defunct fast-food restaurant chains
 List of ice cream parlors
 List of pizza chains
 Lists of restaurants
 List of revolving restaurants
 List of seafood restaurants

References

Chains